A superstorm is a large, unusually-occurring, destructive storm without another distinct meteorological classification, such as hurricane or blizzard.

Origin and usage

Before the early 1990s, the phrases "storm of the century" or "perfect storm" were generally used to describe unusually large or destructive storms. The term "superstorm" was employed in 1993 by the National Weather Service to describe a Nor'easter in March of that year. The term is most frequently used to describe a weather pattern that is as destructive as a hurricane, but which exhibits the cold-weather patterns of a winter storm.

Examples

 Hurricane Patricia, strongest tropical cyclone by wind speed, with sustained winds at least 20 mph faster than its runner-up.
 Great Gale of 1880, northwest United States.
 North Sea flood of 1953, A powerful system that triggered severe flooding in the British Isles and Netherlands.
 Columbus Day Storm of 1962, Pacific Northwest windstorm.
 Great Storm of 1975, central and southeast United States.
 Braer Storm of January 1993, North Atlantic.
 1993 Storm of the Century, eastern North America.
 Hanukkah Eve windstorm of 2006, Pacific Northwest windstorm.
 Great Coastal Gale of 2007, a series of three powerful Pacific Northwest storms.
 January 2008 North American storm complex, Pacific extratropical cyclone over North America.
 October 2009 North American storm complex, extratropical cyclone over western North America.
 January 2010 North American winter storms, a group of unusually-powerful extratropical cyclones that affected California and the Contiguous United States.
 October 2010 North American storm complex, extratropical cyclone that impacted North America
 November 2011 Bering Sea cyclone, cyclone that affected Alaska.
 Hurricane Sandy (informally referred to as a "superstorm" by the media), an Atlantic hurricane that became an extremely powerful extratropical cyclone over the Eastern United States.
 January 2013 Northwest Pacific cyclone, extratropical cyclone.
 March 2014 nor'easter, an extremely powerful extratropical cyclone that acquired a wind field four times the size of Hurricane Sandy's.
 November 2014 Bering Sea cyclone, extremely powerful extratropical cyclone in the Bering Sea
 January 2018 North American blizzard, one of the most powerful extratropical cyclones recorded off the East Coast of the United States, brought blizzard conditions to much of the Eastern U.S.
 March 2019 North American blizzard, a powerful extratropical cyclone in the United States that drew comparisons to the 1993 Storm of the Century.
 Hurricane Dorian, an Atlantic hurricane that degenerated to an extremely powerful extratropical cyclone south of Atlantic Canada.

See also

 ARkStorm
 Hypercane
 Perfect storm
 Bomb cyclone
 Storm of the Century (disambiguation)

References

Storm
1990s neologisms